Arnie Dickins (born 1991) is an Australian judoka who competes in the men's 60 kg category. At the 2012 Summer Olympics, he was narrowly defeated in the first round. He also lost in the preliminary round of the 2014 Commonwealth Games. He has been Australian Judo Champion on three occasions.

Career 
Born in the UK, Dickins moved to Australia when he was 14.  He had already won two British Championships and three British School Championships.  He won the senior Australian Championship in 2010 and the senior Oceania Championship in the same year.  He won a silver medal in the Oceania Championships in 2011, then won it again in 2012 to qualify for the 2012 Olympics.  At the 2012 Olympics, he lost in the first round to Betkili Shukvani.

In 2014, he won the Oceania Championship, this time in the under-73 kg division.

References

External links
 

Living people
Australian male judoka
Olympic judoka of Australia
Judoka at the 2012 Summer Olympics
Commonwealth Games competitors for Australia
Judoka at the 2014 Commonwealth Games
1991 births
People from Redland City